Leukocyte-specific transcript 1 protein is a protein that in humans is encoded by the LST1 gene.

References

Further reading